Oblivion is an album by the rock group Utopia, released in January 1984.

The album represents a turning point for the band, stepping away from the stripped down sound of their 1982 self-titled album in favor of a fuller, more mainstream contemporary pop sound, a direction that would continue on POV, the band's final album that would be released the following year. This shift in sound is most noticeable due to an increased use of electronic drums and triggers by John "Willie" Wilcox. In addition, synthesizers and sequencers, common ingredients of Utopia's music dating back to their debut release, feature more heavily than usual across the album's runtime.

Released by US-based independent label Passport Records in early 1984, the album generated moderate sales, peaking at #74 on the Billboard 200 in March 1984.

Three songs were released as singles: "Crybaby" b/w "Winston Smith Takes It on the Jaw", which peaked at #30 on Billboard's Mainstream Rock chart in February 1984, becoming their biggest hit on that chart; "Love With a Thinker" b/w "Welcome to My Revolution" (released only in the UK); and "Maybe I Could Change" b/w "Love With a Thinker" (released only in Australia). The latter two failed to chart.

J. D. Considine wrote in Musician: "Further proof that 'Utopia' is derived from the Latin word for 'nowhere'."

Track listing

Personnel
 Todd Rundgren - vocals, guitar, saxophone
 Kasim Sulton - vocals, bass guitar
 Roger Powell - vocals, keyboards
 John "Willie" Wilcox - vocals, drums

Charts
Album - Billboard

References

External links 

1984 albums
Todd Rundgren albums
Albums produced by Todd Rundgren
Utopia (band) albums
Passport Records albums